Vives House is a historic house located at 923 Jackson Street in Thibodaux, Louisiana.

Built in 1892, the house is a one-story frame cottage in Queen Anne Revival style with some Stick-Eastlake details.

The house was added to the National Register of Historic Places on July 15, 2009.

See also
 National Register of Historic Places listings in Lafourche Parish, Louisiana

References

Houses on the National Register of Historic Places in Louisiana
Houses completed in 1892
Queen Anne architecture in Louisiana
Stick-Eastlake architecture in Louisiana
Houses in Lafourche Parish, Louisiana
National Register of Historic Places in Lafourche Parish, Louisiana